Tregelles is a surname. Notable people with the surname include:

 Edwin Octavius Tregelles (1806–1886), English ironmaster, civil engineer, and Quaker minister
 Samuel Prideaux Tregelles (1813–1875), English biblical scholar, textual critic, and theologian